A clutch is a mechanical device which provides for the transmission of power from one component to another.

Clutch may also refer to:

Automotive 

 In the automotive sense, clutch may be slang for a manual transmission
 Or, it may be short for the clutch pedal used to operate a manual transmission vehicle

Music
Clutch (band), a musical group from Frederick, Maryland
The Clutch, an American collective of songwriters
Clutch (Clutch album), 1995
Clutch (Peter Hammill album), 2002
 "Clutch", a song by Ken Carson from the 2021 album Project X
Clutch, the part of a hi-hat stand that holds the upper cymbal of a drum kit

Periodicals
Clutch (magazine), a digital magazine
Clutch (literary magazine), a defunct small press literary magazine

Sports
Clutch (mascot), the mascot of the Houston Rockets
Clutch, a mascot of the Tohoku Rakuten Golden Eagles
Clutch (sports), a term referring to the ability to perform under pressure
Clutch hitter, referring to baseball

Other uses
Clutch (eggs),  a collection of eggs in a single nest
Clutch (handbag), a purse designed to be carried (clutched) in one's hand
Clutch (pin fastener), also known as a butterfly clutch or dammit, a device used to secure pins
Clutch (G.I. Joe), a fictional character in the G.I. Joe universe
Clutch (web series), a Canadian crime/thriller web series created by Jonathan Robbins
Mr. Clutch, a nickname

See also
Double clutch (disambiguation)
Clutched, a digital media company